Bolton Hill is a neighborhood in Baltimore, Maryland, with 20 blocks of mostly preserved buildings from the late 19th century. It is listed on the National Register of Historic Places, preserved as a Baltimore City Historic District, and included within the boundaries of Baltimore National Heritage Area. The neighborhood is bounded by North Avenue, Mount Royal Avenue, Cathedral Street, Dolphin Street, and Eutaw Place.  Bolton Hill is a largely residential neighborhood with three-story row houses with red brick, white marble steps, and high ceilings. There are also larger more ornate originally single-family houses, many houses of worship, parks, monuments, and a few large apartment buildings. Many significant residents have lived in the neighborhood, including F. Scott Fitzgerald, Woodrow Wilson, the Cone sisters, and Florence Rena Sabin.

Bolton Hill is within easy walking distance of the State Center station on the Baltimore Metro Subway and the University of Baltimore/Mt. Royal and Cultural Center stations on the Baltimore Light Rail.

Demographics

As of the 2010 Census, there were 4,974 people residing within the Bolton Hill neighborhood boundaries.  The racial makeup of Bolton Hill, as found in the 2010 census, was 56.4% White, 31.8% African American, 7.3% Asian, 0.2% Native American, 1.1% Other Races, and 3.2% Two or more Races. 65.8% of housing units were renter-occupied, 24% were owner occupied, and 10.2% were vacant, as of 2010.

History

Bolton Hill is named after the estate of George Grundy, who named his estate house after Bolton le Moors, which was located at the site of the current Fifth Regiment Armory. In 1832, The Northern Central Railroad built Bolton Station which was the terminal of the line until 1850 when Calvert Street Station opened. Around 1850, the area began to transition from large estate to traditional Baltimore row houses, which were built along a diagonal street grid, unlike the traditional north–south grid of most Baltimore neighborhoods. This grid was constructed by Thomas Poppleton to follow now Pennsylvania Avenue and the Jones Falls. Early row houses featured plain brick facades with decorative cornices, door surrounds, and window lintels. Later, row houses were constructed featuring more ornate designs. Construction of row houses continued until the end of the 19th century, but a few large apartments were constructed at the beginning of the 20th century.

Unlike other prominent neighborhoods in Baltimore at the end of the 19th century, which had restrictive covenants against African-Americans, Jews, and Asians, Bolton Hill was a relatively diverse neighborhood. Although socially segregated, many African-American servants for the mansions of wealthy Bolton Hill residents lived in the alley houses of Bolton Hill. At the end of the 19th century, Baltimore's German Jewish community moved to Bolton Hill. Jews had moved to the western edge of Bolton Hill, and many synagogues, such as Baltimore Hebrew, Chizuk Amuno, and Shearith Israel, moved to McCullough Street and Madison Avenue just west of Bolton Hill. Furthermore, two large temples were built within Bolton hill. Eutaw Place Temple was built by Temple Oheb Shalom on Eutaw Place in 1892, and the Har Sinai Congregation built a large temple on Bolton Street in 1894—now the oldest Reform congregation in the United States.

At the beginning of the 20th century, white residents of Bolton Hill began to fear the expanding African-American community to the west of the neighborhood, eventually leading to white flight. The Mount Royal Improvement Association (MRIA) was established in 1928 and pushed for covenants against African-American residency in the neighborhood. The associated boasted that Bolton hill was a "protected area" and claimed that "the greatest achievement of the Mount Royal Improvement Association has been the subjecting of the property in its area to a restriction for white occupancy only." By the mid-20th century, however, many Bolton Hill residents moved to the suburbs for modern homes with yards, and in the early 1960s most of the Jewish institutions had moved to the northwest suburbs.

In the early 1960s, federal urban renewal funds were used to demolish houses on the western edge of the neighborhood, which were considered "slums" and targeted for "stabilization." Several large new developments were built in their place. In 1967, Bolton Hill became a Baltimore City historic district, and in 1971 it was placed on the National Register of Historic Places. As a result, the majority of the neighborhood was largely preserved.

In 2018, the community association changed its name from Mount Royal Improvement Association to the Bolton Hill Community Association; this was to abandon any connection with its origins in racial segregation and to be more representative of its location and diverse community.

Beginning in 2012, popular Netflix series House of Cards filmed the Underwood's home based in Bolton Hill to represent their Washington, D.C. home.

Notable residents
 James M. Cain (2418 Linden Ave.), Author of The Postman Always Rings Twice.
 Lillie Mae Carroll Jackson (1320 Eutaw Pl.), Civil rights leader
 Claribel and Etta Cone (1711 Eutaw Pl.), art collectors, early patrons of Pablo Picasso, Henri Matisse, and benefactors of Baltimore Museum of Art.
 F. Scott Fitzgerald (1307 Park Ave.), American author who published Tender is the Night while living in Bolton Hill from 1933 to 1935. Zelda Fitzgerald received treatment at The Sheppard and Enoch Pratt Hospital, and Fitzgerald is known to have entertained other famous literary icons, such as Gertrude Stein and John Dos Passos,  in his Bolton Hill rowhouse.
 Leon Fleisher (1723 Park Ave.), pianist and conductor.
 Daniel Coit Gilman (1300 Eutaw Pl.), first president of Johns Hopkins University and first director of Johns Hopkins Hospital.
 Harry Gilmor (150 W. Lanvale St.), Confederate cavalry officer.
 Edith Hamilton (1312 Park Ave.), Classicist author, first Headmistress of the Bryn Mawr School.
 Alice Hamilton (1312 Park Ave.), leading expert in the field of occupational health and Harvard's first female professor.
 Jacob Hollander (1802 Eutaw Pl.), treasurer of Puerto Rico and political economist.
 Chris Keating (musician) (Bolton Place), Lead singer of rock band Yeasayer
 Charles Marshall (1214 Eutaw Pl.), Chief of Staff to General Robert E. Lee at Appomattox.
 Garry Moore (1335 Bolton Street), longtime television host.
 Curt Richter  (221 W. Lafayette Ave.), Biologist, psychobiologist and geneticist at Johns Hopkins University.
 Louis Rukeyser lived in 1200 and 1400 blocks of Bolton Street, host of PBS' long-running weekly show on business and finance, "Wall Street Week With Louis Rukeyser."
 Florence Rena Sabin (1431 and 1325 Park Ave.), pioneering medical researcher, first woman to hold a full professorship at Johns Hopkins School of Medicine, the first woman elected to the National Academy of Sciences, and the first woman to head a department at the Rockefeller Institute for Medical Research.
 Gertrude Stein (2408 Linden Ave.), writer and international influence in the arts
 Woodrow Wilson (1210 Eutaw Pl.), President of the United States, President of Princeton University and Governor of New Jersey. Wilson lived in Bolton Hill during his doctoral studies at Johns Hopkins.

See also
 Brown Memorial Presbyterian Church
 Mount Royal Station
 Maryland Institute College of Art (MICA)

References

External links

, including photo dated 1969, at Maryland Historical Trust
Bolton Hill Historic District, boundary map, at Maryland Historical Trust
Bolton Hill Community Association
Baltimore Sun Coverage
Baltimore, Maryland, a National Park Service Discover Our Shared Heritage Travel Itinerary
Bolton Hill Historical Markers

 
Neighborhoods in Baltimore
University of Baltimore
Prince Hall Freemasonry
Maryland Institute College of Art
Historic districts on the National Register of Historic Places in Baltimore
Baltimore National Heritage Area
Bolton Station